The 2018 MLS Re-Entry Draft took place on December 14, 2018 (Stage 1) and December 20, 2018 (Stage 2). All 24 Major League Soccer clubs were eligible to participate. The priority order for the MLS Re-Entry Draft was reverse order of finish in 2018, taking into account playoff performance. The 2019 expansion team, FC Cincinnati, had selection #24.

Available to all teams in Stage 1 of the Re-Entry draft were:
 Players who were at least 23 years old and had a minimum of three years of MLS experience whose contract options were not exercised by their clubs. They were available at their option salary for 2019.
 Players who were at least 25 years old with a minimum of four years of MLS experience who were out of contract and whose club did not wish to re-sign them at their previous salary. They were available for at least their 2018 salary.
 Free Agents that chose to participate.

Players who were not selected in Stage 1 of the Re-Entry Draft were made available in Stage 2. Clubs selecting players in Stage 2 were able to negotiate a new salary with the player. If a selected player was not under contract, the selecting club was required to make a genuine offer to the player within seven days subject to League Office approval.

Players who remained unselected after Stage 2 were made available to any MLS club on a first-come, first-served basis.

Teams also had the option of passing on their selection.

Available players
Players were required to meet age and service requirements to participate as stipulated by the terms of the MLS Collective Bargaining Agreement. The league released a list of all players available for the Re-Entry Draft on December 13, 2018.

Stage One
The first stage of the 2018 MLS Re-Entry Draft took place on December 14, 2018.

Round 1

Round 2

Stage Two
The second stage of the 2018 MLS Re-Entry Draft took place on December 20, 2018.

Round 1

Round 2

References 

Major League Soccer drafts
Mls Re-entry Draft, 2018
MLS Re-Entry Draft